Antonio Bevilacqua (22 October 1918 – 29 March 1972) was an Italian professional road bicycle racer. He won the 1951 Paris–Roubaix.

Major results

1940 – Lygie
1941 – Dop, Ferroviario Venezia
 1st, GP di Duca degli Abruzzi
 1st, GP Maresciello dell Aria
 1st, Coppa del Littirio
1942 – Bianchi
 2nd, Milan–San Remo
 7th, Giro di Lombardia
1943 – Viscontea
  Pursuit Champion
1944 – VC Bassano
1946 – Wilier Triestina
 17th, Giro d'Italia
 Winner Stages 2 & 4
1947 – Lygie
 1st, Stage 13, Giro d'Italia
  World Pursuit Championship
1948 – Atala
 1st, Stage 7, Giro d'Italia
  World Pursuit Championship
 33rd, Tour de France
1949 – Atala
  Pursuit Champion
 40th, Giro d'Italia
 Winner Stage 18
1950 – Wilier Triestina
  World Pursuit Champion
  Road Race Champion
  Pursuit Champion
 1st, Tre Valli Varesine
 1st, Milano-Vicenza
 1st, Trofeo Baracchi (with Fiorenzo Magni)
 2nd, Giro di Lombardia
 29th, Giro d'Italia
1951 – Benotto-Ursus
  World Pursuit Champion
  Pursuit Champion
 1st, Paris–Roubaix
 1st, Giro del Veneto
  World Road Race Championship
 3rd, National Road Race Championship
 26th, Giro d'Italia
 Winner Stages 2 & 20
1952 – Benotto
 1st, Milano–Vignola
  World Road Race Championship
 10th, World Road Race Championship
 69th, Giro d'Italia
 Winner Stages 3 & 20
1953 – Benotto
 1st, Coppa Bernocchi
  World Road Race Championship
1954 – Doniselli-Lansetina

References

Bibliography

External links

Italian male cyclists
Italian Giro d'Italia stage winners
UCI Track Cycling World Champions (men)
1918 births
1972 deaths
Cyclists from the Metropolitan City of Venice
Italian track cyclists
20th-century Italian people